Due anni dopo is the second album by Italian singer-songwriter Francesco Guccini. It was released in 1970 by EMI.

Overview
The album was recorded in November 1969 in Milan. On the front cover the name of the author was simply "Francesco"; this already occurred in Guccini's first album, Folk beat n. 1. Due anni dopo was the first album in which Guccini collaborated with Deborah Kooperman, an American folksinger who played fingerstyle guitar, a style which was not well known in Italy at the time. Her name was misspelled as Deborah Kopperman in the credits, where Giorgio Vacchi is listed as arranger, while Guccini is the author of all the songs in the album.
The main theme was the passage of time, and how bourgeois hypocrisy affects everyday life; notable influences were French music and the style of the Italian poet Giacomo Leopardi.
  "Primavera di Praga" was a criticism of the 1968 Sovietic occupation of Czechoslovakia, while the title track is about the years he spent in Modena, in his teens. The two songs, along with "Vedi cara", became Guccini's classics.

Reception
The album was generally well received by critics. Allmusic says it was a "strong collection", while the Italian music website Ondarock states Due anni dopo had lyrics with clear "poetic and narrative connotations".

Track listing
Side A
"Lui e lei" – 3:12
"Primavera di Praga" – 3:38
"Giorno d'estate" – 3:47
"Il compleanno" – 3:31
"L'albero ed io" – 2:54
"Due anni dopo" – 3:43
Side B
"La verità" – 3:21
"Per quando è tardi" – 3:31
"Vedi cara" – 4:58
"Ophelia" – 2:26
"L'ubriaco" – 2:33
"Al trist" – 3:41

References

Francesco Guccini albums
1970 albums